Svane is a surname. Notable people with the surname include:

Hans Svane (1606–1668), Danish statesman and ecclesiastic
Randall Svane (born 1955), American composer
Rasmus Svane (born 1997), Danish-German chess grandmaster
Troels Svane (born 1965), Danish cellist

See also
Bishop Hans Svane’s 1647 Revision of Bishop Hans Poulsen Resen’s Translation of 1607
Neka mi ne svane Marija Magdalena (1999) ► "Neka mi ne svane" ("May the dawn never come") was the Croatian entry in the Eurovision Song Contest 1998, performed in Croatian by Danijela

da:Svane
fr:Svane
no:Svane